Válber Mendes Ferreira or simply Válber (born September 22, 1981 in São Luís), is a Brazilian attacking midfielder.

Honours
Alagoas State League: 2000
Belgian Cup: 2002, 2003

External links

CBF 
furacao.com 
atleticopr.com 
rubronegro.net 

1981 births
Living people
Brazilian footballers
Brazilian expatriate footballers
Santa Cruz Futebol Clube players
Sampaio Corrêa Futebol Clube players
R.A.A. Louviéroise players
Goiás Esporte Clube players
Moto Club de São Luís players
Club Athletico Paranaense players
Avaí FC players
Associação Atlética Ponte Preta players
Guaratinguetá Futebol players
Red Bull Brasil players
Criciúma Esporte Clube players
Ceará Sporting Club players
Sportspeople from Maranhão
Expatriate footballers in Belgium
Expatriate footballers in South Korea
K League 1 players
Daejeon Hana Citizen FC players
Brazilian expatriate sportspeople in South Korea
Association football midfielders